Parshakova is the name of several rural localities in Russia:
Parshakova, Krasnovishersky District, Perm Krai, a village in Krasnovishersky District, Perm Krai
Parshakova, Kudymkarsky District, Perm Krai, a village in Kudymkarsky District, Perm Krai